Johannes Jacobus Voskuil  (1 July 1926, in The Hague – 1 May 2008, in Amsterdam) was a Dutch novelist known best for his epic novel Het Bureau. In 1997 he won the Ferdinand Bordewijk Prijs for his novels Meneer Beerta and Vuile handen, and in 1998 the Libris Prize for Het bureau 3: Plankton.

Bibliography
An extensive scientific bibliography can be found in Doelman, that of literary publications in Heymans (until 1999).

Scientific Works
1956 - The Dutch of Hindustani children in Suriname
1969 - Hanging the afterbirth of the horse
1978 - Twelve bakers and two bakers' daughters have a conversation with JJ Voskuil
1979 - From wickerwork to brick. History of the walls of the farmhouse in the Netherlands
1982 - Kohieren of the tenth medal of Overschie 1561 and Twisk 1561

Fiction
1963 - On closer inspection
1998 - Word of thanks for the acceptance of the Bordewijk Prize (included in Tirade 373)
1999 - Nicolien's mother
2000 - Travel Diary 1981
2002 - Requiem for a Friend
2004 - Casually, hikes 1957-1973
2005 - Outside shot, hikes 1974-1982
2006 - Gradually, hikes 1983-1992
2007 - Journal 1955-1956 (choice from Voskuil's diary, included in Tirade 417)
2007 - Among other things, portraits and memories
2007 - Bestiary (short sketches)
2007 - Alone in the world (short story, included in Tirade 421)
2008 - Human Children (stage, recorded in Tirade 424)

Posthumous
2009 - Within the skin
2010 - Childhood Memories
2012 - The Neighbor (novel)

The Office
1996 - Mister Beerta
1996 - Dirty Hands - (Ferdinand Bordewijk Prize and Prix des Ambassadeurs)
1997 - Plankton - (Libris Prize and Prix des Ambassadeurs)
1998 - The A.P. Beerta Institute
1999 - And Melancholy, Too
2000 - Failure
2000 - The Death of Maarten Koning
2000 - Entrance to The Office

The Office was included in the list of the NRC's Best Dutch novels in 2007.

Others
1963 - When I Grow Up [43] (poem)
1995 - Geert van Oorschot , Letters from a publisher (includes three letters to JJ Voskuil, preceded by his memories of Van Oorschot)
2005 - Hanny Michaelis , A selection from her poems by JJ Voskuil (anthology, compiled and with an introduction by JJ Voskuil)
2012 - Hopefully things will soon go better with God (Four letters to Henk Romijn Meijer , bibliophile edition in 100 copies.)
2013 - Henk Romijn Meijer & JJ Voskuil, A trans-Atlantic correspondence (includes correspondence from 1962-1963, delivered by Gerben Wynia )
2014 - I am not me . Voskuil's book reviews from the 1950s, preceded by an extensive interview by Detlev van Heest with Voskuil's widow.

See also
NRC's Best Dutch novels
Libris Prize
Ferdinand Bordewijk Prize

1926 births
2008 deaths
20th-century Dutch novelists
20th-century Dutch male writers
Dutch male novelists
Ferdinand Bordewijk Prize winners
Libris Prize winners
Writers from The Hague
University of Amsterdam alumni